Edmond K. Cowan (born 1937) was a Sierra Leonean politician. He was the speaker of Parliament of Sierra Leone from 2000 to 2007. He was subsequently appointed as the country's Ombudsman.

References

Living people
Sierra Leone Creole people
Speakers of the Parliament of Sierra Leone
Sierra Leone People's Party politicians
20th-century Sierra Leonean lawyers
1937 births
Ombudsmen